The Atlanta Falcons are a professional American football team based in Atlanta. The Falcons compete in the National Football League (NFL) as a member club of the league's National Football Conference (NFC) South division.  The Falcons joined the NFL in 1965 as an expansion team, after the NFL offered then-owner Rankin Smith a franchise to keep him from joining the rival American Football League (AFL).

The Falcons have appeared in two Super Bowls, the first during the 1998 season in Super Bowl XXXIII, where they lost to the Denver Broncos  and the second 18 years later, a  overtime loss to the New England Patriots in Super Bowl LI.

The Falcons' current home field is Mercedes-Benz Stadium, which opened for the 2017 season; the team's headquarters and practice facilities are located at a  site in Flowery Branch, northeast of Atlanta in Hall County.

Franchise history

Professional football comes to Atlanta (1962)
Professional football first came to Atlanta in 1962, when the American Football League (AFL) staged two preseason contests, with one featuring the Denver Broncos vs. the Houston Oilers and the second pitting the Dallas Texans against the Oakland Raiders. Two years later, the AFL held another exhibition, this time with the New York Jets taking on the San Diego Chargers.

In 1965, after the Atlanta–Fulton County Stadium (then known simply as Atlanta Stadium) was built, the city of Atlanta felt the time was right to start pursuing professional football.  One independent group which had been active in NFL exhibition promotions in Atlanta applied for franchises in both the AFL and NFL, acting entirely on its own with no guarantee of stadium rights. Another group reported it had deposited earnest money for a team in the AFL.

With everyone running in different directions, some local businessmen (Cox Broadcasting) worked out a deal and were awarded an AFL franchise on  contingent upon acquiring exclusive stadium rights from city  NFL Commissioner Pete Rozelle, who had been moving slowly in Atlanta matters, was spurred by the AFL interest and headed on the next plane down to Atlanta to block the rival league's claim on the city of Atlanta. He forced the city to make a choice between the two leagues; by June 30, the city picked Rankin Smith and the NFL.

The AFL's original expansion plans in June 1965 were for two new teams  in Atlanta and  It later evolved into the Miami Dolphins in 1966 and the Cincinnati Bengals in 1968. The odd number of teams (15) resulted in one idle team (bye) each week, with each team playing 14 games over 15 weeks (similar to : 12 games over 13 weeks). The second expansion team, the New Orleans Saints, joined the NFL as planned in 1967 as its sixteenth franchise.

The Atlanta Falcons franchise began when it was approved to begin play in 1966 by a unanimous vote of the NFL club owners on June 21, 1965. Rozelle granted ownership nine days later on June 30 to 40-year-old Rankin Smith Sr., an Executive Vice President of Life Insurance Company of Georgia. He paid $8.5 million, the highest price in NFL history at the time for a franchise. Rozelle and Smith made the deal in about five minutes and the Atlanta Falcons brought the largest and most popular sport to the city of Atlanta. The Atlanta expansion team became the 15th NFL franchise, and they were awarded the first overall pick in the 1966 NFL Draft as well as the final pick in each of the first five rounds. They selected consensus All-American linebacker Tommy Nobis from the University of Texas, making him the first-ever Falcon. The league also held the expansion draft six weeks later in which Atlanta selected unprotected players from the 14 existing franchises. Although the Falcons selected many good players in those drafts, they still were not able to win right away.

The Atlanta team received its nickname on August 29, 1965. Miss Julia Elliott, a school teacher from Griffin, was singled out from many people who suggested "Falcons" as the nickname for the new franchise. She wrote: "the Falcon is proud and dignified, with great courage and fight. It never drops its prey. It is deadly and has a great sporting tradition."

Smith family era (1966–2001)
The Falcons' inaugural season was in 1966, and their first preseason game was on August 1, a loss to the Philadelphia Eagles. Under head coach Norb Hecker, Atlanta lost their first nine regular-season games in 1966; their first victory came on the road against the struggling New York Giants on November 20 in Yankee Stadium. Two weeks later, Atlanta won at Minnesota, and beat St. Louis in Atlanta the next week for their first home win.  The team finished the 1960s with 12 wins in four seasons.

The Falcons had their first Monday Night Football game in Atlanta during the 1970 season, a 20–7 loss to the Miami Dolphins.
In the 1978 season, the Falcons qualified for the playoffs for the first time and won the Wild Card game against the Eagles 14–13. The following week, they lost to the Dallas Cowboys 27–20 in the Divisional Playoffs.

In the 1980 season, after a nine-game winning streak, the Falcons posted a franchise then-best record of 12–4 and captured their first NFC West division title. The next week, their dream season ended at home with a loss to the Cowboys 30–27 in the divisional playoffs. In the strike-shortened 1982 season, the Falcons made the playoffs but lost to the Minnesota Vikings, 30–24. Falcons coach Leeman Bennett was fired after the loss. The team then had losing seasons for the next eight years.

In the 1989 NFL Draft, the Falcons selected cornerback Deion Sanders in the first round, who helped them for the next four years, setting many records for the franchise. "Neon Deion" (a.k.a. "Prime Time") had a flashy appeal and helped bring media attention to one of the league's most anonymous franchises. Sanders was also famous for playing on major league baseball teams (New York Yankees and the Atlanta Braves) while simultaneously playing in the NFL.

After defeating the New Orleans Saints in the NFC Wild Card game, the Falcons' 1991 season ended in a divisional playoff loss to the Washington Redskins. In the 1991 NFL Draft, the Falcons selected quarterback Brett Favre as the 33rd overall pick. During his rookie season, he played in two games where he amassed a record of four passing attempts with no receptions and two interceptions. The following February, Favre was traded to the Green Bay Packers.

In 1992, the Atlanta Falcons opened a new chapter in their history moving into the newly constructed Georgia Dome, where the team has defeated all 31 other NFL teams at least once during its time there.

Dan Reeves years (1997–2003) 
In 1998, under recently acquired head coach Dan Reeves, quarterback Chris Chandler and running back Jamal Anderson the "Dirty Bird" Falcons had their greatest season to date. On November 8, they beat the New England Patriots 41–10, ending a streak of 22 losses at cold-weather sites. The team finished with a franchise-best 14–2 regular-season record and the NFC West division championship. On January 17, 1999, the Falcons upset the top-seeded Vikings at the Hubert H. Humphrey Metrodome in the NFC Championship Game 30–27, in an exciting overtime victory. However, in their first-ever Super Bowl appearance, they lost 34–19 to the defending champion Denver Broncos in Super Bowl XXXIII.

In the second game of the Falcons 1999 season, running back Jamal Anderson, who had been a key player in the Falcons' 1998 success, suffered a season-ending knee injury. The Falcons finished the season with a very disappointing 5–11 regular-season record. In 2000, the Falcons suffered through another horrendous season finishing 4–12 and once again missing the playoffs.

In the 2001 NFL draft, the Falcons orchestrated a trade with the San Diego Chargers, acquiring the first overall pick (which was used on quarterback Michael Vick) in exchange for wide receiver-return specialist Tim Dwight and the fifth overall pick (used on running back LaDainian Tomlinson).

The Falcons finished the 2001 season with a record of 7–9 and missed the playoffs. Jessie Tuggle retired following 14 seasons in Atlanta.

Arthur Blank era (2002–present) 
On December 6, 2001, Arthur M. Blank reached a preliminary agreement with the Falcons' Taylor Smith to purchase the team. In a special meeting prior to Super Bowl XXXVI in New Orleans on February 2, 2002, NFL owners voted unanimously to approve the purchase.

The 2002 season saw the Falcons return to the playoffs with a regular-season record of 9–6–1, tying the Pittsburgh Steelers. It was Vick's first year as the starter, and the team, with newly acquired running back Warrick Dunn, delivered the Green Bay Packers their first home playoff loss ever. A 20–6 loss to the Donovan McNabb-led Philadelphia Eagles the following week, however, ended the Falcons' season.

On March 19, 2003, the Falcons presented their new logo. During the 2003 preseason Vick broke his leg and missed the first 12 games of the season. After losing 7 straight games, the decision was made to release head coach Dan Reeves. Wade Phillips acted as interim coach for the final 3 games. Although the Falcons won 3 of their last 4 games after the return of Vick, they ended up with a 5–11 record that year. In 2004, a new head coach, Jim L. Mora, was hired and Vick returned for the full season. The Falcons went 11–5, winning their third division title and earning a first-round bye into the playoffs. In the divisional playoffs, the Falcons defeated the St. Louis Rams, 47–17, in the Georgia Dome, advancing to the NFC Championship Game, which they lost to the Eagles, 27–10.

In , Michael Vick became the first quarterback in league history to rush for more than 1,000 yards in a season, with 1,039. After finishing the season 7–9, however, coach Jim Mora was dismissed and Bobby Petrino, the University of Louisville's football coach, replaced him. Before the 2007 season began, Vick was suspended indefinitely by the NFL after pleading guilty to charges involving dog fighting in the state of Virginia. On December 10, 2007, Vick received a 23-month prison sentence and was officially cut from the Atlanta roster.

For the 2007 season, the Falcons were forced to start Joey Harrington at quarterback. On December 11, 13 games into his first NFL season as head coach, Bobby Petrino resigned without notice to coach at the University of Arkansas, leaving the beleaguered players only a note in the locker room. Secondary Coach Emmitt Thomas was named interim coach for the final three games of the season on December 12. The Falcons ended the year with a dismal 4–12 record.

After the tumultuous and disappointing 2007 season, the Falcons made a number of moves, hiring a new General Manager and head coach, drafting a new starting quarterback, and signing a starting running back.

On January 13, 2008, the Falcons named former Patriots director of college football scouting Thomas Dimitroff General Manager. On January 23, Jacksonville Jaguars defensive coach and former linebackers coach for the 2000 Super Bowl champion Baltimore Ravens Mike Smith was named the Falcons' new head coach. Chargers back-up running back Michael Turner agreed to a 6-year, $30 million deal on March 2. On April 26, Matt Ryan (quarterback from Boston College) was drafted third overall in the 2008 NFL draft by the Falcons.

The Falcons finished the 2008 regular season with a record of 11–5, and the #5 seed in the playoffs. On December 21, 2008, Atlanta beat the Minnesota Vikings 24–17 to clinch a wild card spot, earning a trip to the playoffs for the first time since 2004. The Falcons would go on to lose in the wild-card round of the 2008 NFL playoffs to the eventual NFC champion Arizona Cardinals, 30–24.

Matt Ryan started all 16 games in his rookie season and was named the Associated Press Offensive Rookie of the Year. First-year head coach Mike Smith was named 2008 NFL Coach of the Year.

Although they failed to make the playoffs in 2009 the team rallied to win their final three regular-season games to record back-to-back winning seasons for the first time in franchise history. The Falcons defeated the Tampa Bay Buccaneers 20–10 in the final game of the season to improve their record to 9–7.

In 2010, with a regular-season record of 13–3, the Falcons secured a third straight winning season, their fourth overall divisional title, and the top overall seed in the NFC playoffs; however, the Falcons were overpowered by the eventual Super Bowl XLV champion Green Bay Packers in the NFC Divisional Playoffs 48–21. The Falcons scored 414 points – the fifth-most in franchise history. The team sent an NFL-high and franchise-best nine players to the 2011 Pro Bowl.

The Falcons made a surprise trade up with the Cleveland Browns in the 2011 NFL draft to select Alabama wide receiver Julio Jones sixth overall. In exchange, the Falcons gave up their first-, second- and fourth-round draft picks in 2011, and their first and fourth draft picks in 2012. Jones, along with teammates Tony Gonzalez and Roddy White, have since been dubbed Atlanta's "Big Three" (based on their total number of reception yards). On August 30, 2011, Sports Illustrated senior writer Peter King, who correctly predicted the 2011 Super Bowl, made his predictions for the 2011 season and picked the Falcons to defeat the San Diego Chargers in the 2012 Super Bowl. The Falcons finished the season at 10–6, securing the fifth seed after a Week 17 beatdown of Tampa Bay in which the Falcons pulled their starters after leading 42–0 just 23 minutes into the game.

The Falcons then went on to play the New York Giants in a 2011 NFC Wild Card Game at MetLife Stadium in East Rutherford, New Jersey. The first half was a defensive struggle, with the first points coming off of a safety by the Falcons, giving Atlanta a 2–0 lead. In the second quarter, though, Eli Manning connected with Hakeem Nicks for a short touchdown pass to make it 7–2 Giants heading into the second half. Then the Giants took control, as Manning threw for two more touchdown passes to Mario Manningham and Nicks and the defense completed its shutout of the Falcons to give the New York Giants the win, 24–2, and the Falcons their third straight playoff loss with Matt Ryan and Mike Smith. After the season, defensive coordinator Brian VanGorder accepted a coaching job at Auburn University, and the offensive coordinator Mike Mularkey took the head coaching job in Jacksonville.

Atlanta exploded out of the gate, going a franchise-best 8–0 and remaining the last unbeaten team in the NFL that year. Their hopes to get an undefeated season came to an end with a 27–31 loss to the division rival Saints. Julio Jones had a remarkable second year, grabbing 10 touchdowns and 1,198 yards. The Falcons finished the season 13–3, and clinched the number one seed in the NFC playoffs.

The Falcons played the Seattle Seahawks in their first playoff game. Although they went down 28–27 with only 31 seconds left on the clock, Matt Ryan led the team to their first playoff victory, 30–28. It was the only playoff victory in the Mike Smith era.

The Atlanta Falcons then advanced to face the San Francisco 49ers. The Falcons seized control of the game early with a Matt Bryant field goal, a trio of Matt Ryan touchdown passes caught by Julio Jones and Tony Gonzalez coupled with outstanding defensive play. By the end of the half, the score was 24–14. The tides of the game began to shift in the second half as the 49ers rallied back with a pair of Frank Gore touchdown runs. Atlanta's offense attempted to reply but were ultimately shut down by the 49er defense. A few series later, late in the 4th quarter with little time remaining, Atlanta found themselves in a 4th and 4 situation at the 10-yard line. The Falcons needed just 10 more yards to secure victory and advance to their first Super Bowl berth in 14 years. Matt Ryan fired a pass to Roddy White which was ultimately broken up by inside linebacker NaVorro Bowman, resulting in a 28–24 defeat.

Following the success of the previous season, the Falcons were an expected Super Bowl contender. However, injuries hampered the team's performance and the team finished the season 4–12. With that, the streak of consecutive winning seasons came to an end and Mike Smith had his first losing season as a head coach. Tony Gonzalez, in his final season in the NFL, was selected to the 2014 Pro Bowl as a starter representing Team Rice. Following the conclusion of the 2012 season, director of player personnel Les Snead departed the team to join the St. Louis Rams and Dave Caldwell, assistant to general manager Thomas Dimitroff, left the team to join the Jacksonville Jaguars. Scott Pioli, former GM of the Kansas City Chiefs, was announced as the Falcons' new assistant GM. Mike Smith was given a one-year extension on his contract as head coach. The Falcons had the 6th overall pick in the 2014 NFL draft with which they selected Jake Matthews, who played as offensive tackle for Texas A&M.

Despite having another rough season, the Falcons still had an opportunity to qualify for the playoffs at the end of the regular season. The Falcons hosted the Carolina Panthers in their regular season finale, with the winners clinching the NFC South division. Unfortunately, the Falcons lost in a 34–3 blowout as Matt Ryan threw two interceptions that were returned for touchdowns and got sacked six times. The Falcons finished the season 6–10, marking the second consecutive losing season for the team. The following day, Mike Smith was fired after seven seasons as head coach. The Falcons would soon hire Seattle Seahawks defensive coordinator Dan Quinn as the team's 16th head coach. The Falcons had the 8th overall pick in the 2015 NFL draft with which they selected Vic Beasley, a defensive end from Clemson University.

Dan Quinn years (2015–2020) 

In February 2015, the team was investigated by the NFL for alleged use of artificial crowd noise in the Georgia Dome. The Falcons lost a 2016 NFL Draft selection as a result of the league's investigation.

Dan Quinn's first season saw a 5–0 start, the team's best start in four years. They would then struggle throughout the rest of the season by losing 8 of their last 11 games, resulting in an 8–8 record. They did, however, give the Panthers their only regular-season loss. The Falcons used their first-round pick in the 2016 NFL Draft on safety Keanu Neal from the University of Florida.

In the Falcons' 25th and final season in the Georgia Dome, Atlanta lost their week 1 game to the Buccaneers 24–31. The Falcons would then win their next four including one over the Panthers, when the franchise set new records: Matt Ryan threw for 503 yards, and Julio Jones caught 12 passes for 300 yards. Beating the San Francisco 49ers 41–13 in Week 15, the Falcons improved to 9–5 and secured their first winning season since 2012. One week later, the Falcons defeated the Panthers in Charlotte, North Carolina, and clinched their first NFC South division title since 2012. In their last regular-season game at the Georgia Dome, the Falcons defeated the New Orleans Saints, and secured an 11–5 record and a first-round bye.

In the divisional round of the playoffs, Atlanta defeated the Seahawks 36–20 in the Georgia Dome, and hosted their last game at the Dome against the Green Bay Packers in the NFC Championship Game on January 22, 2017. The Falcons defeated the Packers 44–21 to advance to Super Bowl LI as the NFC champions. Atlanta was up 28–3 late in the third quarter, and the New England Patriots scored 31 unanswered points, with the last 6 in the first-ever overtime in the Super Bowl. The Patriots' 25-point comeback was the largest in Super Bowl history.

In 2016, the Falcons scored 540 points in the regular season, the seventh-most in NFL history, tied with the Greatest Show on Turf (the 2000 St. Louis Rams). However, the Falcons defense gave up 406 points, 27th in the league.

The Falcons moved into their new home, the Mercedes-Benz Stadium, this season. Their first game ever played at the new stadium was a preseason loss to the Arizona Cardinals. The first regular-season game at the new stadium was a rematch of the 2016–17 NFC Championship, with Atlanta defeating Green Bay 34–23. Their first loss of the season was a 23–17 home defeat to the Buffalo Bills in week 4. The team returned to the playoffs with a 10–6 record (albeit with a third-place finish in the NFC South). The Falcons defeated the Los Angeles Rams 26–13 in the Wild Card round, but their 2017 season came to an end a week later in the Divisional Playoff round at the hands of the eventual Super Bowl champion Philadelphia Eagles 15–10.

In their first game with new uniforms, the Falcons lost to the Seattle Seahawks at home 38–25. The Falcons then suffered comebacks made by both the Cowboys on the road (39–40) and then back in Atlanta against the Bears (26–30). On October 11, after the team suffered a 23–16 loss at home against the Carolina Panthers and fell to 0–5, the Falcons announced the firings of Quinn and Dimitroff. Defensive coordinator Raheem Morris took over for the rest of the season, leading the team to a 4–12 record. Morris was not retained after the season, and soon joined the Los Angeles Rams as their defensive coordinator.

Arthur Smith years (2021-present) 
On January 15, 2021, the Falcons announced that Tennessee Titans offensive coordinator Arthur Smith had been named the 18th head coach in franchise history. Four days later, New Orleans Saints executive Terry Fontenot was named the Falcons' new general manager. Tight end Kyle Pitts was selected with the 4th pick of the 2021 draft, and longtime star receiver Julio Jones was traded to the Titans, after publicly requesting a trade from Atlanta. The Falcons improved on their record from the prior year, finishing the season with a 7–10 record.

On March 21, 2022, the Falcons traded longtime star quarterback Matt Ryan to the Indianapolis Colts.

Stadiums

The Falcons have called three stadiums home in their 51 years of existence, and its third home in their history opened in the late summer of 2017. The first was the Atlanta–Fulton County Stadium, sharing with the Atlanta Braves Major League Baseball team until 1991. In 1992, the Georgia Dome was built, and the Falcons played there from its opening to the 2016 season. The Dome has been frequently used for college football, including Georgia State football and college bowl games such as the Peach Bowl.

In an effort to replace the aging Georgia Dome and potentially host a future Super Bowl, team owner Arthur Blank proposed a deal with the city of Atlanta to build a new state-of-the-art stadium not far from where the Georgia Dome is located. Blank will contribute $800 million and the city of Atlanta will contribute an additional $200 million via bonds backed by the city's hotel/motel tax towards the construction of a retractable roof stadium. Blank will contribute additional money for cost overruns if it is needed. The team will provide up to $50 million towards infrastructure costs that weren't included in the construction budget and to retire the remaining debt on the Georgia Dome. In addition, Blank's foundation and the city will each provide $15 million for development in surrounding neighborhoods. Though the total cost of the stadium was initially estimated to be around $1 billion, the total cost was revised to $1.5 billion according to Blank. In March 2013, the Atlanta City Council voted 11–4 in favor of building the stadium. The retractable roof Mercedes-Benz Stadium broke ground in May 2014, and became the third home stadium for the Falcons and the first for the new Atlanta United FC Major League Soccer club upon opening in 2017.

Logo and uniforms

The Atlanta Falcons' colors are red, black, silver and white. When the team began play in 1966, the Falcons wore red helmets with a black falcon crest logo. In the center of the helmet was a center black stripe surrounded by two gold stripes and two white stripes. These colors represented the two college rival schools in the state of Georgia; rival schools Georgia Tech Yellow Jackets (white and gold) and the Georgia Bulldogs (red and black). Although the gold was removed after several seasons, the white remains to this day. They wore white pants and either black or white jerseys. At first, the falcon crest logo was also put on the jersey sleeves, but it was replaced by a red and white stripe pattern four years later. They switched from black to red jerseys in 1971, and the club began to wear silver pants in 1978. The facemasks on the helmets were initially gray, becoming white in 1978, and then black in 1984; the team wore black face masks until its 2020 redesign.

A prototype white helmet was developed for the team prior to the 1974 season, but was never worn.

In 1990, the uniform design changed to black helmets, silver pants, and either black or white jerseys. The numbers on the white jerseys were black, but were changed to red in 1997. (The red numerals could be seen on the away jerseys briefly in 1990.)

Both the logo and uniforms changed in 2003. The logo was redesigned with red and silver accents to depict a more powerful, aggressive falcon, which now more closely resembles the capital letter F.

Although the Falcons still wore black helmets, the new uniforms featured jerseys and pants with red trim down the sides. The uniform design consisted of either black or white jerseys, and either black or white pants. During that same year, a red alternate jersey with black trim was also introduced. The Falcons also started wearing black cleats with these uniforms.

In 2004, the red jerseys became the primary jerseys, and the black ones became the alternate, both worn with white pants. In select road games, the Falcons wear black pants with white jerseys. The Falcons wore the all-black combination against the New Orleans Saints for four straight seasons starting in 2004, With the last time being in 2007, losing 34–14. They wore the combination again in 2006, against the Tampa Bay Buccaneers in Week 2. The Falcons won that game, 14–3. The Falcons also wore their all-black uniform in 2007 against the New York Giants, and in 2008 against the Carolina Panthers and against the Tampa Bay Buccaneers (for the second time). After that, the black pants and uniforms were retired and the white pants were now used full-time with the regular uniforms.

In the 1980s, the Falcons wore their white uniforms at home most of the time because of the heat. When the Falcons started playing in a dome, the team switched to their dark uniforms for home games but have worn their white uniforms at home a few times since switching to the dome. It was announced at the 2009 state of the franchise meeting that the Falcons would wear 1966 throwback uniforms for a couple games during the 2009 season. The Atlanta Falcons wore 1966 throwback jerseys for two home games in 2009 – against the Carolina Panthers on September 20 and against the Tampa Bay Buccaneers on November 29. The Falcons won both of those games. They donned the throwbacks again for 2 games in 2010, against Baltimore and San Francisco, winning both of those games as well. The throwbacks were used twice in 2011 and 2012; both times were against the Panthers and Saints. However, the throwbacks were retired following a 2013 NFL rule requiring only one helmet shell per team.

The Falcons unveiled an all-red Color Rush uniform on September 13, 2016; however, due to the fact that the Falcons and the Tampa Bay Buccaneers had similar all-red Color Rush uniforms, the Falcons were unable to wear their Color Rush uniform until the 2017 season.

Also in 2016, the Falcons unveiled a mixed throwback uniform set. The uniform tops, pants and socks closely resembled their 1960s kits. From 2016 to 2021, due to the NFL's one-shell rule, the Falcons wore the black helmets with the original logo decal similar to the design they wore in the 1990s. However, starting in 2022, with the NFL now reinstating the use of alternate helmets, the Falcons brought back the original red helmets to pair with their throwback uniforms.

It was revealed in January 2020 that the Falcons will change uniforms for the 2020 NFL season. The ensuing design featured the return to black as the primary home uniform color for the first time since 2003. Both the primary home and road uniforms featured the "ATL" abbreviation in red above either white or black numbers with red drop shadows. The white and black tops are usually paired with either white or black pants. The alternate uniform featured a red/black gradient design and also featured the "ATL" abbreviation in white above white numbers with black drop shadows. Black pants are only used with this uniform. All three uniforms feature red side stripes. The current throwback uniform was also retained. In addition, the Falcons switched to matte helmets with the enlarged falcon logo and gray facemasks.

Rivalries

New Orleans Saints

In every season from 1970 to the present, the Falcons have shared a division with the New Orleans Saints (first the NFC West, and now the NFC South). Over this time, a heated rivalry has developed between the two cities' franchises, as they were the only two NFL teams in the Deep South for quite some time. The series is the oldest and most iconic rivalry in the NFC South. Atlanta leads the series 52–48.

Carolina Panthers

In addition, the Falcons share a similar, yet smaller, rivalry with the Carolina Panthers, with both teams having been in the NFC West from the Panthers' founding in 1995 to the NFL realignment in 2002, where they have been in the NFC South since then. The Falcons lead the series 27–17.

Tampa Bay Buccaneers

Finally, the Falcons share a rivalry with the Tampa Bay Buccaneers since the NFL realignment in 2002. Before that, Tampa Bay was in the AFC West. After, they were in the NFC Central before the realignment.

Philadelphia Eagles

The Eagles lead the Falcons 21–15–1, with a 3–1 lead in playoff games. The rivalry first emerged after the Falcons upset the Eagles in the 1978 Wild Card Round, and only intensified further in the 2000s thanks to the rivalry between prominent dual-threat quarterbacks Donovan McNabb,  and Michael Vick. Recently, the Falcons lost to the Eagles in the 2017 divisional round.

Statistics

Season-by-season records

Record vs. opponents
Includes postseason records

Source:
 
|-
| St. Louis/Phoenix/Arizona Cardinals || 15 || 16 || 0 ||  || L 33-34 || October 13, 2019 || State Farm Stadium || 0–1 postseason
|-
| Baltimore Ravens || 2 || 4 || 0 ||  || L 16–26 || December 2, 2018 || Mercedes-Benz Stadium ||
|-
| Buffalo Bills || 7 || 6 || 0 ||  || L 15–29 || January 2, 2022 || Highmark Stadium ||
|-
| Carolina Panthers || 34 || 20 || 0 ||  || W 29–21 || December 12, 2021 || Bank of America Stadium ||
|-
| Chicago Bears || 14 || 15 || 0 ||  || W 27-24 || November 20, 2022 || Mercedes-Benz Stadium ||
|-
| Cincinnati Bengals || 5 || 9 || 0 ||  || L 36–37 || September 30, 2018 || Mercedes-Benz Stadium ||
|-
| Cleveland Browns || 4 || 12 || 0 ||  || W 23–20 || November 11, 2022 || Mercedes-Benz Stadium ||
|-
| Dallas Cowboys || 11 || 17 || 0 ||  || L 3–43 || November 14, 2021 || AT&T Stadium || 0–2 postseason
|-
| Denver Broncos || 7 || 8 || 0 ||  || W 34–27 || November 8, 2020 || Mercedes-Benz Stadium || 0–1 postseason
|-
| Detroit Lions || 14 || 25 || 0 ||  || W 20–16 || December 26, 2021 || Mercedes-Benz Stadium ||
|-
| Green Bay Packers || 14 || 17 || 0 ||  || L 16–30 || October 5, 2020 || Lambeau Field || 2–2 postseason
|-
| Houston Texans || 2 || 3 || 0 ||  || L 32–53 || October 6, 2019 || NRG Stadium ||
|-
| Baltimore/Indianapolis Colts || 2 || 15 || 0 ||  || L 24–27 || September 22, 2019 || Lucas Oil Stadium ||
|-
| Jacksonville Jaguars || 5 || 3 || 0 ||  || W 21–14 || November 28, 2021 || TIAA Bank Field ||
|-
| Kansas City Chiefs || 3 || 7 || 0 ||  || L 14–17 || December 27, 2020 || Arrowhead Stadium ||
|-
| San Diego/Los Angeles Chargers || 8 || 3 || 0 ||  || L 17–20 || December 13, 2020 || SoFi Stadium ||
|-
| St. Louis/Los Angeles Rams || 28 || 48 || 2 ||  || L 10–37 || October 20, 2019 || Mercedes-Benz Stadium || 2–0 postseason
|-
| Miami Dolphins || 5 || 9 || 0 ||  || W 30–28 || October 24, 2021 || Hard Rock Stadium ||
|-
| Minnesota Vikings || 11 || 19 || 0 ||  || W 40–23 || October 18, 2020 || US Bank Stadium || 1–1 postseason
|-
| New England Patriots || 6 || 9 || 0 ||  || L 0–25 || November 18, 2021 || Mercedes-Benz Stadium || 0–1 postseason
 |-
| New Orleans Saints || 53 || 52 || 0 ||  || L 20–30 || January 9, 2022 || Mercedes-Benz Stadium || 1–0 postseason
|-
| New York Giants || 14 || 11 || 0 ||  || W 17–14 || September 26, 2021 || MetLife Stadium || 0–1 postseason
|-
| New York Jets || 8 || 5 || 0 ||  || W 27–20 || October 10, 2021 || Tottenham Hotspur Stadium ||
|-
| Las Vegas/Oakland/Los Angeles Raiders || 8 || 7 || 0 ||  || W 43–6 || November 29, 2020 || Mercedes-Benz Stadium ||
|-
| Philadelphia Eagles || 14 || 18 || 1 ||  || L 6–32 || September 12, 2021 || Mercedes-Benz Stadium || 1–3 postseason
|-
| Pittsburgh Steelers || 2 || 14 || 1 ||  || L 17–41 || October 7, 2018 || Heinz Field ||
|-
| San Francisco 49ers || 32 || 47 || 1 ||  || W 28–14 || October 16, 2022 || Mercedes-Benz Stadium || 1–1 postseason
|-
| Seattle Seahawks || 7 || 12 || 0 ||  || W 25–38 || September 25, 2022 || Lumen Field || 2–0 postseason
|-
| Tampa Bay Buccaneers || 28 || 29 || 0 ||  || L 17–30 || December 5, 2021 || Mercedes-Benz Stadium ||
|-
| Tennessee Titans/Houston Oilers || 7 || 8 || 0 ||  || L 10–24 || September 29, 2019 || Mercedes-Benz Stadium ||
|-
| Washington Commanders || 10 || 15 || 1 ||  || L 30–34 ||October 3, 2021 || Mercedes-Benz Stadium || 0–1 postseason
|-
! Total || 378 || 455 || 6 ||  || || || || 10–14

 Notes International Series

Single game records
 Rushing: Michael Turner, 220 (September 7, 2008)
 Passing: Matt Ryan, 503 (October 2, 2016)
 Passing touchdowns: Wade Wilson, 5 (December 13, 1992) and Matt Ryan, 5 (September 23, 2018)
 Receptions: William Andrews, 15 (September 15, 1981)
 Receiving yards: Julio Jones, 300 (October 2, 2016)
 Interceptions: Several Falcons, 2, most recently Damontae Kazee, 2 (December 8, 2019)
 Field goals: Norm Johnson, 6 (November 13, 1994)
 Total touchdowns: T. J. Duckett, 4 (December 12, 2004) and Michael Turner, 4 (November 23, 2008)
 Points scored: T. J. Duckett, 24 (December 12, 2004) and Michael Turner, 24 (November 23, 2008)
 Sacks: Adrian Clayborn, 6 (November 13, 2017)

Single season records
 Passing attempts: 651 Matt Ryan (2013)
 Passing completions: 439 Matt Ryan (2013)
 Passing yards: 4,944 Matt Ryan (2016)
 Passing touchdowns: 38 Matt Ryan (2016)
 Passing interceptions: 25 Bobby Hebert (1996)
 Completion percentage: 69.9 Matt Ryan (2016)
 Passing rating: 117.1 Matt Ryan (2016)
 Rushing attempts: 410 Jamal Anderson (1998)
 Rushing yards: 1,846 Jamal Anderson (1998)
 Rushing touchdowns: 17 Michael Turner (2008)
 Receiving catches: 136 Julio Jones (2015)
 Receiving yards: 1,871 Julio Jones (2015)
 Receiving touchdowns: 15 Andre Rison (1993)
 Quarterback sacks: 16.5 John Abraham (2008)
 Pass interceptions: 10 Scott Case (1988)
 Field goal attempts: 40 Jay Feely (2002)
 Field goals made: 34 Matt Bryant (2016 and 2017)
 Points: 158 Matt Bryant (2016)
 Total touchdowns: 17 Michael Turner (2008)

Career records
 Passing attempts: 6,817 Matt Ryan (2008–2021)
 Passing completions: 4,460 Matt Ryan (2008–2021)
 Passing yards: 51,186 Matt Ryan (2008–2021)
 Passing touchdowns: 321 Matt Ryan (2008–2021)
 Passing interceptions: 147 Matt Ryan (2008–2021)
 Passing rating: 94.6 Matt Ryan (2008–2021)
 Rushing attempts: 1,587 Gerald Riggs (1982–1988)
 Rushing yards: 6,631 Gerald Riggs (1982–1988)
 Rushing yards by a QB: 3,859 Michael Vick (2001–2006)
 Rushing touchdowns: 60 Michael Turner (2008–2012)
 Receiving catches: 808 Roddy White (2005–2015)
 Receiving yards: 12,125 Julio Jones (2011–2020)
 Receiving touchdowns: 63 Roddy White (2005–2015)
 Quarterback sacks: 68.5 John Abraham (2006–2012)
 Pass interceptions: 39 Rolland Lawrence (1973–1980)
 Field goal attempts: 296 Matt Bryant (2009–2019)
 Field goals made: 224 Matt Bryant (2009–2019)
 Points: 1,163 Matt Bryant (2009–2019)
 Total touchdowns: 63 Roddy White (2005–2015)
 Pass interception return yards: 658 Rolland Lawrence (1973–1980)
 Pass interception returned for touchdowns: 4 Deion Jones (2016–2022)
 Punt return yards: 1,723 Allen Rossum (2002–2006)
 Kickoff return yards: 5,489 Allen Rossum (2002–2006)
 Longest punt: 75 John James (1972–1981) and Harold Alexander (1993–1994)
 Longest field goal: 59 Morten Andersen (1995–2000, 2006–2007) and Matt Bryant (2009–2019)

Players

Current roster

Pro Football Hall of Famers

Sanders, Humphrey, Andersen, and Gonzalez are the only players in the Hall of Fame that have been inducted based substantially on their service with the Falcons. Andersen spent eight of his 25 NFL seasons with the Falcons, previously being the team's all-time scoring leader, but he also played his first 13 NFL seasons with the New Orleans Saints, leading that team's career scoring list.

Ring of Honor
The Atlanta Falcons organization does not officially retire jersey numbers, but considers certain players' jerseys worthy of being honored. The Falcons Ring of Honor honors individual players.

Georgia Sports Hall of Fame

Starting quarterbacks

Draft history

Coaching staff

Head coaches

In their history, the Atlanta Falcons have had 18 head coaches.

Current staff

Radio and television
The Falcons' flagship radio station is WZGC 92.9 The Game. Wes Durham, son of longtime North Carolina Tar Heels voice Woody Durham, is the Falcons' play-by-play announcer, with former Atlanta Falcons QB and pro football veteran, Dave Archer serving as color commentator.

In 2014, The CW owned-and-operated station WUPA became the official television station of the Falcons, gaining rights to its preseason games, which are produced by CBS Sports.

In the regular season, the team's games are seen on Fox's O&O affiliate WAGA. When the Falcons challenge an AFC team, CBS affiliate WANF will air those games while Sunday night games are televised on WXIA, the local NBC affiliate.

Radio affiliates

Source:

Georgia

Alabama

Mississippi

South Carolina

Tennessee

Notes and references

External links

 
 Atlanta Falcons at the National Football League official website

 
American football teams in Atlanta
National Football League teams
American football teams established in 1966
1966 establishments in Georgia (U.S. state)